Irvington is a neighborhood in the Northeast section of Portland, Oregon.  According to the city's Office of Community and Civic Life, it consists of a rectangular area extending east to west from NE 7th Ave. to NE 26th Ave., and north to south from NE Fremont St. to NE Broadway.  It borders the King, Sabin, and Alameda neighborhoods to the north; Alameda and Grant Park to the east; Sullivan's Gulch and the Lloyd District to the south; and Eliot to the west.  (The Sabin and Alameda neighborhoods extend into the northeastern part of Irvington, creating two areas of overlap.)

The neighborhood is distinguished by a number of large stately homes, often positioned on multiple or oversized lots.  The Irvington Community Association funds its activities by holding a well-attended tour of these homes each spring.

History
The Irvington Addition was platted in 1887 and underwent its initial development in the 1890s under the oversight of developer Ellis Hughes and the Irvington Investment Company.  The addition was planned as a self-contained middle to upper class residential district in which commercial activity was to be prohibited, so as to maintain property values.  After a period of nominal growth, development in Irvington began to slow due to competition from the Rose City Park and Laurelhurst developments, as well as the outbreak of World War I. The neighborhood was added to the National Register of Historic Places as the Irvington Historic District in 2010.

Proposed boundary decrease
In December, 2014, the Irvington Historic District Northeast Boundary Decrease Committee proposed removing 34 blocks from the Irvington Historic District. Citing differences in physical appearance and historic development, the committee of Irvington property owners advocated trimming an area roughly bounded on the south by NE Knott Street, on the north by NE Fremont Street, on the east by NE 27th, and on the west by NE 21st. The committee suggested that the proposed boundary decrease area more closely resembles an early-to-mid twentieth century residential working-class neighborhood, not the core area of historic Irvington.

References

External links

History of Irvington by Carl Townsend
Irvington Street Tree Inventory Report

 
Historic districts on the National Register of Historic Places in Oregon
National Register of Historic Places in Portland, Oregon
Neighborhoods in Portland, Oregon